Avondale is a train station in Decatur, Georgia. It is on the Blue Line of the Metropolitan Atlanta Rapid Transit Authority (MARTA) rail system. The station is at-grade and has two island platforms, one for each direction. The center two tracks are not normally used for through service. Because of these middle tracks, it is not uncommon for trains to be bound for Avondale, having passengers change trains at Avondale. A limited number of Green Line trains originate and terminate at Avondale rather than at their normal terminus at Edgewood / Candler Park, though these trains bypass East Lake and Decatur.

Green Line service is expected to be extended to Avondale full-time when the platform at Bankhead station is expanded to accommodate 8-car trains, in order to increase service on the East-West trunk line.

This station opened on June 30, 1979; this was the original eastern terminus of the Blue Line. This station has parking (823 spaces) available on E. College Avenue.

This station mainly serves Avondale Estates (although technically not located in the city limits) and Decatur Heights, as well as The City of Clarkston and The City of Tucker and Communities in: Scottdale, Northlake & North Decatur.

Bus service is provided at this station to Clifton Springs Health Center, GRTA/Panola Park & Ride, DeKalb Lou Walker Senior Center, North DeKalb DeKalb Mall, DeKalb Farmers Market, Avondale Estates, Tucker, City of Clarkson, Mountain Industrial Business District, DeKalb Veterans Administration Clinic and DeKalb County Department of Family and Children Services Center (DFACS).

East of the station is Avondale Yard, a train yard used to service, clean, store, and test the fleet of rolling stock it services. Adjacent to the yard is Laredo Bus Facility.

Station layout

Clifton Corridor
Avondale station is a proposed terminus for rapid transit along the Clifton Corridor, a proposed public transportation corridor stretching from Lindbergh Center eastwards, following the existing CSX rail corridor to Emory University, with possible continuation along the northern edge of Decatur via Suburban Plaza on N. Decatur Rd. and on to Avondale. Bus, light rail and heavy rail rapid-transit options are under consideration.

Landmarks and popular locations served
Your DeKalb Farmers Market
Avondale Estates Village
Dekalb Veterans Administration Clinic
Dekalb Department of Family and Children Services (DFACS)

Buses at this station
The station is served by the following MARTA bus routes:

North Bus Bays
 Route 75 - Lawrenceville Highway / North DeKalb Mall
 Route 117-  Rockbridge Road / Panola Road / GRTA Park and Ride
 Route 120 - East Ponce de Leon Avenue

South Bus Bays
 Route 8 - North Druid Hills Road
 Route 114 - Columbia Drive / Clifton Springs Road

References

External links 

MARTA Station Page
nycsubway.org Atlanta page

Blue Line (MARTA)
Green Line (MARTA)
Metropolitan Atlanta Rapid Transit Authority stations
Railway stations in DeKalb County, Georgia
Railway stations in the United States opened in 1979
Decatur, Georgia
1979 establishments in Georgia (U.S. state)